Toru Ito (born 8 April 1966) is a Japanese luger. He competed in the men's singles event at the 1988 Winter Olympics.

References

External links
 

1966 births
Living people
Japanese male lugers
Olympic lugers of Japan
Lugers at the 1988 Winter Olympics
Sportspeople from Hokkaido